Danse avec les stars (DALS) is the French version of British TV show Strictly Come Dancing,  first broadcast on TF1 on February 12, 2011, the participants having been selected in November 2010. The first series finale took place on March 19, 2011. A second series was broadcast between October 8 and November 19, 2011. Since then TF1 has chosen to broadcast the program once a year, in the autumn. The show has tentatively scheduled its thirteenth series to begin in the second half of 2023.

The competition rules are similar to those of the original British version.

Seasons

Presenters

 Host
 Co-host
 Competed as a contestant

Judges

 Full time judge
 Competed as a contestant

Couples

 Winner of the season
 Runner-up of the season
 Third place of the season
 Last place of the season
 Withdrew in the season
 Participating in current season
 Absent

Statistics

Ranking of best candidates 

Female

Male

Winners

Winners by percentage of vote

Best Average by season

Ranking of worst candidates 

Female

Male

Last places

1David Douillet didn't got a single note in season 12.

Worst Average by season

1David Douillet didn't got a single note in season 12.

Highest and lowest score by dance 
The best and worst performances in each dance according to the judges' marks are as follows (out of 40)

Highest and lowest score of each contestant 
The best and worst performances of each contestant according to the judges' marks are as follows (out of 40)

Highest and lowest note of each contestant 
The best and worst performances of each contestant according to the judges' marks are as follows (out of 10)

1Miguel got two 5 in his duet with Tonya Kinzinger but his worst note, if we actually talk about Miguel's performances, is 6.
2Loïc got a 4 in his duet with EnjoyPhoenix but his worst note, if we actually talk about Loïc's performances, is 6.
3Bilal got three 6 in his duet with Michou but his worst note, if we actually talk about Bilal's performances, is 7.
4Gérémy got 8.9 from the public in his contemporary dance but talking about judge's notes, his best note is 8.

Perfect scores

Below average scores

First week scores above 30 

1In season 11 & 12, when couples got 4 Immunity buzz, the couples were directly qualified for next prime without receiving notes.

Celebrities by number of 10 

1During 5th week, Marie-Claude Pietragalla was replaced by season 2 winner Shy'm as member of the jury.
2Corneille got a 10 during a fusion dance (Rumba / Contemporary dance).

Professional partners by number of final

Professional partners by number of win

Professional partners by number of last places

Highest and Lowest score by professional partners 
The best and worst performances for each professional partners according to the judges' marks are as follows (out of 40)

1Julien Brugel got 37.6 in season 6 during a duet dance with Priscilla Betti, Véronic DiCaire & Yann-Alrick Mortreuil but talking about dances with his own partners, his best score was 33.3 with his season 2 partner, Sheila.
2Silvia Notargiacomo got 38.5 in season 6 during a trio dance with Loïc Nottet & Denitsa Ikonomova but talking about dances with her own partners, her best score was 34 with her season 2 partner, Francis Lalanne.
3Yann-Alrick Mortreuil got 37.6 in season 6 during a duet dance with Priscilla Betti, Véronic DiCaire & Julien Brugel but talking about dances with his own partners, his best score was 34 with his season 7 partner, Karine Ferri.
4Emmanuelle Berne got 37 in season 6 during a trio dance with Priscilla Betti & Christophe Licata but talking about dances with her own partners, her best score was 30 with her season 7 partner, Kamel Le Magicien.
5Adrien Caby got 32 in season 11 during a duet dance with Aurélie Pons, Tayc & Fauve Hautot but talking about dances with her own partners, her best score was 30 with her season 11 partner, Aurélie Pons.

Highest and lowest score by season 
The best and worst performances for each season according to the judges' marks are as follows (out of 40)

All dances by season

Ratings

Tours

See also 

 List of French Adaptations of Television Series from Other Countries

References

 
2011 French television series debuts
TF1 original programming